Lego Architecture is a Lego theme, which aims to “celebrate the past, present and future of architecture through the Lego Brick”. The brand includes a series of Lego sets designed by ‘Architectural Artist’ Adam Reed Tucker, and each contain the pieces and instructions to build a model of a famous architectural building in micro-scale.

Development 
Adam Reed Tucker earned a degree in architecture at Kansas State University in 1996. While there, he sought a method to join his two passions of art and architecture, and hit upon the idea of using Lego bricks.  From this, he founded Brickstructures, Inc., and began to design and build models of famous landmarks.  His work was noticed by the Lego Group, and together they formed a partnership to release some of his models as commercially available Lego sets under the Lego Architecture brand.

Architecture sets 
According to Bricklink, The Lego Group released 64 playsets as part of the Lego Architecture theme.

Sets in the product line contain a premium booklet, that – besides the build instructions – also includes various information and pictures of the building itself.

By the beginning of 2009, six sets had been released in the range, under two 'series'. Within the 'Landmark Series' are models of the Sears Tower (21000), John Hancock Center (21001), the Empire State Building (21002), and the Space Needle (21003).  Within the 'Architect Series' are models of the Guggenheim Museum (21004) and Fallingwater (21005).

In the beginning of July 2010, a seventh set, the White House (21006), was released. An eighth set (21007) was released in November 2010: New York's Rockefeller Center. The ninth set (21009), Farnsworth House (Plano, Illinois), was released in April 2011. A tenth set (21008), The Burj Khalifa, was released in June 2011. The Willis Tower (21000) was also released in 2011, this kit was a re-issue of the original Sears Tower kit; the only change was the printed tile to reflect the building's renaming.

An eleventh and twelfth set, the Robie House (21010) and the Brandenburg Gate (21011) were released in September 2011.

In January 2012, it was announced that the next Architecture set would be 21012 Sydney Opera House. The set was released in March 2012.

In June 2012, Big Ben (21013) was released. In July 2012, the Namdaemun Gate (renamed Sungnyemun Gate) (21016) was released. In September 2012, the Villa Savoye (21014) was released. The Eames House (21015) and Glass House were scheduled and then canceled, as it never came out as a set. The company tried to add the Eames House in again with set number (21025), but nothing could be done to put it in production.

In June 2013, the Leaning Tower of Pisa (21015) was announced for the Lego Architecture series. Its set number (21015) replaced the original Eames House after it was canceled. United Nations Headquarters (21018) came out next. In October 2013, Marina Bay Sands and the Eiffel Tower were both announced.

Impact 
The product range has been reviewed favorably by many commentators. Journalist Jenny Williams said "The scale on these kits is pretty small, though, so don't expect exquisite detail. But creating with Lego bricks is quite a fun way to pay homage to great architects".

In popular media 
A near-exact replica of set 21006, The White House, appears in the eight story arc of the Japanese manga series JoJo's Bizarre Adventure, JoJolion, where it used by the villain character Poor Tom to activate his "stand" power, "Ozon Baby".

References

External links
 

Architecture
Products introduced in 2008